"Un geste d'amour" or "Look Into Yourself" (English version) is the first single from Anggun's second French studio album, Désirs contraires. It was released in September 2000 by Columbia and Sony Music France.

Track listing
 "Un geste d'amour" (Erick Benzi) – 4:06
 "Look Into Yourself" (Anggun, Erick Benzi) – 4:06

Song
"Un geste d'amour" was composed, written, and produced by French producer Erick Benzi. The song was influenced by tropical music.

The song has an English version, "Look Into Yourself", that was released on Anggun's second international studio album, Chrysalis. There is also an Indonesian version entitled "Yang 'Ku Tunggu", recorded as a bonus track on Chrysalis for the Southeast Asian market only. Both versions, English and Indonesian, were written by Anggun herself and did not feature any adaptation from its French original, meaning that all three versions have different lyrical themes. "Un geste d'amour" became Anggun's second song to be record in three different languages after "La rose des vents".

"Un geste d'amour" did not replicate the success of Anggun's French debut single, "La neige au Sahara". It only managed to reach number 62 on the French Singles Top 100 Chart. However, the Indonesian version gained bigger success. It topped the charts in Indonesia and Malaysia. The English version was not chosen as a promo single.

Charts

 A Yang 'Ku Tunggu

References 

Anggun songs
2000 singles
Songs written by Erick Benzi
2000 songs
Sony Music singles